David Avellan is an American grappler and professional mixed martial artist who has fought for World Extreme Cagefighting and Bodog Fight promotions. Past opponents include French journeyman Antony Rea and UFC contender Aaron Simpson.

David has competed in the 2005 ADCC Submission Wrestling World Championship, the 2007 ADCC Submission Wrestling World Championship, the 2009 ADCC Submission Wrestling World Championship, where he won a Bronze Medal in the 87.9 kg division, and most recent the 2011 ADCC Submission Wrestling World Championship and the 2013 ADCC Submission Wrestling World Championship. He competed at the ADCC World Championship in 2015.

David Avellan is most well known for his grappling techniques and abilities, with matches against Ronaldo Souza, Robert Drysdale, and Demian Maia. He holds victories over Brazilian Jiu Jitsu Black Belts Rafael Lovato Jr., Tarsis Humphreys, Amaury Bitetti, Roberto Abreu, Rener Gracie, and Alexandre Ribeiro. He has been featured in Grappling Magazine multiple times and has been featured in the local news as well.

He continues to develop new training videos and techniques that are widely used in the MMA community including the Kimura Trap.

David Avellan is credited with introducing the term 'kimura trap' and 'kimura trap system' into BJJ common vocabulary.

Personal life

Education 
In early childhood David was misdiagnosed with autism, but credits his parents' home schooling and disbelief in this medical assessment as the reason for his normal development. He eventually re-entered the public school system without issues, and pursued math and science, eventually earning his bachelor's degree in Electrical Engineering from Florida International University. Briefly, he worked in the science and technology industry.

Entry into Athleticism 
In his sophomore year of high school, he followed his brother into wrestling at Killian High School. He suffered from asthma and obesity as a child, but through athletic development and supervised nutrition was able to overcome these obstacles. His coach, Tirso Valls, was very strict and presented the foundations for his future grappling development through wrestling.

Currently he resides in Las Vegas, Nevada and offers training camps and private lessons for students. He also gives lectures and seminars around the world.

Becoming a Mixed Martial Artist 
After a successful wrestling career in high school, David got into NHB (No Holds Barred) fighting. He trained with a local martial arts school before beginning his own grappling club out of a Tae Kwon Do school.

In 2001, Marcos And David Avellan opened the Freestyle Fighting Academy (FFA). David was 19 and Marcos was 20 years old at the time. They originally planned to create a place with a creative and open environment to practice their own training techniques and styles.

After meeting Lloyd Irvin, the Avellan brothers were able to translate the simple gym mentality into a larger scale business operation, and the Freestyle Fighting Academy has become the biggest Mixed Martial Arts gym in South Florida with multiple locations, classes, and students. David and his brother continue to train and teach new generations of fighters on a regular basis. Among his students are George Masvidal (black belt under David Avellan) and Enrico Cocco (black belt under David Avellan).

Tournament Titles 

 2000 KWA Sport Combat III Heavyweight Champion
 2000 FFC Heavyweight Champion
 2001 Rival Classic Heavyweight Champion
 2001 Rival Classic II Heavyweight Champion
 2002 FGA Submission Grappling Open II Heavyweight Champion
 2002 Planet Submission 16-man Absolute Champion
 2002 NAGA New England 10-man Superfight Champion
 2003 NAGA World Light-Heavyweight Champion
 2003 GQ Team USA Member – Cruiserweight
 2003 NAGA All-American Superfight Champion
 2003 NAGA Pro-Am Superfight Champion
 2003 Finisher Cup Superfight Champion
 2003 Grapplemania 4-man Superfight Champion
 2003 GQ Pro Division World Champion
 2003 Ultimate Submission Showdown – Silver Medalist
 2004 Submission Wrestling Open ADCC Superfight Winner
 2004 Grappler's Quest West V Pro Middleweight Champion
 2004 Grappler's Quest Oxydol Challenge – Champion
 2005 ADCC Submission Wrestling World Championship Competitor
 2006 AFC VIII MMA Bout – Winner
 2007 BodogFight Season 4 MMA Bout – Winner
 2007 ADCC Submission Wrestling World Championship Competitor
 2008 WEC Fighter
 2009 ADCC Submission Wrestling World Championship Bronze Medalist
 2011 Grapplers Quest Florida Cruiserweight Champion
 2011 ADCC Submission Wrestling World Championship Competitor
 2013 ADCC Submission Wrestling World Championship Competitor

Mixed martial arts record

|-
| Loss
| align=center| 2-1
| Aaron Simpson
| KO (punch) 
| WEC 36: Faber vs. Brown
| 
| align=center| 1
| align=center| 0:18
| Hollywood, Florida, United States
| 
|-
| Win
| align=center| 2-0
| Antony Rea
| TKO (punches)
| BodogFight - Costa Rica Combat	 	
| 
| align=center| 2
| align=center| 4:15
| Pococí (canton), Costa Rica
| 
|-
| Win
| align=center| 1-0
| Andre Daniels
| Submission (rear naked choke)
| Absolute Fighting Championships 19	 	
| 
| align=center| 1
| align=center| 2:30
| Boca Raton, Florida, United States
|

References

External links

Information about Avellan's program at FFACoach.com 
BJJ Retreat – Experience new adventures while perfecting your Brazilian Jiu Jitsu – Explore the world with fellow martial artists and have a blast
David Avellan MMA Blog
Kimura Trap System – The Ultimate Kimura Submission Lock Series for BJJ and MMA
@davidavellan on Instagram

Living people
American male mixed martial artists
Mixed martial artists from Florida
Light heavyweight mixed martial artists
Mixed martial artists utilizing Brazilian jiu-jitsu
American electrical engineers
Florida International University alumni
American practitioners of Brazilian jiu-jitsu
People awarded a black belt in Brazilian jiu-jitsu
Brazilian jiu-jitsu trainers
American strength and conditioning coaches
Year of birth missing (living people)